Luoyang is a town and the county seat of Boluo County, Huizhou Prefecture, Guangdong Province, China. It is located on the Dong River.

The China National Highway 324 connects Luoyang with the urban districts of Huizhou.

Hallstatt replica 

Luoyang has a housing development area that is a replica of the UNESCO-listed Austrian town Hallstatt.

References 

Boluo County
Towns in Guangdong